The Michael Bossy Trophy (French:Trophée Michael Bossy) is awarded annually to the player in the Quebec Major Junior Hockey League judged to be the best professional prospect. The award is named after former New York Islanders forward Mike Bossy, who played in the QMJHL prior to his Hockey Hall of Fame career.

Winners
List of trophy winners:

References

Quebec Major Junior Hockey League trophies and awards